Park Sung-woong (born January 9, 1973) is a South Korean actor. Following his acting debut in No. 3 in 1997, Park has starred in several movies and television series, notably as a gangster in New World (2013) and a serial killer in The Deal (2015).

Personal life
Park married actress Shin Eun-jung on October 18, 2008. They met while filming The Legend (2007), in which the characters they played were lovers.

Filmography

Film

Television series

Web series

Television show

Ambassadorship 
 PR Ambassador for the 2022 Dunamu Korea Professional Table Tennis League

Awards and nominations

References

External links

 Park Sung-woong at C-JeS Entertainment
 
 
 

South Korean male film actors
1973 births
Living people
South Korean male television actors
Hankuk University of Foreign Studies alumni
20th-century South Korean male actors
21st-century South Korean male actors
People from North Chungcheong Province